In mathematics, in the field of topology, a topological space is said to be a door space if every subset is open or closed (or both). The term comes from the introductory topology mnemonic that "a subset is not like a door: it can be open, closed, both, or neither".

Properties 

Here are some facts about door spaces:

 A Hausdorff door space has at most one accumulation point.
 In a Hausdorff door space if  is not an accumulation point then  is open.

To prove the first assertion, let  be a Hausdorff door space, and let  be distinct points. Then  is closed, since if it were open, then we could say that  is open, contradicting that  is an accumulation point.

An example of a T0 topological space with more than one accumulation point is the  anchor topological space. The  anchor topological space is made up from a non-empty set  equipped with the  topology, where .

See also

References

Bibliography 

 

Properties of topological spaces